Paul Singer may refer to:

Paul Singer (politician) (1844–1911), German politician, co-leader of the SPD
Paul Singer (economist) (1932–2018), Austrian-born Brazilian economist and scholar
Paul Singer (businessman) (born 1944), American founder of hedge fund Elliott Management Corporation